Tove Nilsen (born 25 October 1952) is a Norwegian novelist, children's writer and literary critic.

She made her literary debut in 1974 with the novel Aldri la dem kle deg forsvarsløst naken. Her adolescence novel from a dormitory town, Skyskraperengler (1982) was a bestseller.

She was awarded the Riksmål Society Literature Prize in 1993. Her novel Øyets sult (1993) was nominated for the Nordic Council's Literature Prize.

References

1952 births
Living people
Writers from Oslo
20th-century Norwegian novelists
21st-century Norwegian novelists
Norwegian children's writers
Norwegian literary critics
Norwegian women non-fiction writers
Norwegian women novelists
Norwegian women children's writers
Norwegian women critics
21st-century Norwegian women writers
20th-century Norwegian women writers